Jean-Paul Rostagni (born 14 January 1948 in Drap/Alpes-Maritimes) is a former French footballer.

The Defender played from 1966 to 1969 with AS Monaco. Then he turned over to Girondins Bordeaux and played in 1971/72 for Paris FC.
His last team was then OGC Nice.

From March 1969 to May 1973 he played 25 times for the France national team; scored no goals in these caps and was not on the France team in the big tournaments.

References

Sources
 Jacques Thibert, Les coqs du football, Paris, Calmann-Lévy, 1972, notice biographique de JP Rostagni, p. 63-75 (French)

1948 births
Living people
Sportspeople from Alpes-Maritimes
French footballers
France international footballers
AS Monaco FC players
FC Girondins de Bordeaux players
Paris Saint-Germain F.C. players
Paris FC players
OGC Nice players
Association football fullbacks
Footballers from Provence-Alpes-Côte d'Azur